The 2013 UMass Minutemen baseball team represented the University of Massachusetts Amherst in the 2013 NCAA Division I baseball season.  Mike Stone is in his 26th season as head coach.  The UMass baseball team, was coming off 2012 season in which they were 22-22. The Minutemen play their home games at Earl Lorden Field.  Ultimately, the Minutemen finished the season with a 14-31 win-loss record overall.

2013 Roster

Schedule 

! style="background:#881c1c;color:#FFFFFF;"| Regular Season
|- 

|- align="center" bgcolor="#ffbbb"
| March 1 || #22  || – || USA Baseball National Training Complex  || 4–9 ||M. Ternowchek (1-0)|| D. Jauss (0-1) ||None|| 316 || 0-1 || –
|- align="center" bgcolor="#ffbbb"
| March 2 ||  || – || USA Baseball National Training Complex || 4–6 || B. Thomas (1-0) ||C. LeBlanc (0-1) ||T. Charpie(1)|| 250 || 0–2 || –
|- bgcolor="#ccffcc"
| March 3 ||  || – || USA Baseball Nation Training Complex || 7-6 ||J. Pace (1-0)||B. Barber (0-1)|| None || 150 || 1–2 || –
|- align="center" bgcolor="#ffbbb"
| March 8 || at  || – || Vincent–Beck Stadium || 2-4|| Harrington (4-0)||D. Jauss (0-2) || Carver(2) || 536 ||1–3|| –
|- align="center" bgcolor="#ffbbb"
| March 9 || at Lamar || – || Vincent–Beck Stadium || 2-10 || Chapman (3-0) || M. Trubey (0-1) || None || 456 || 1-4 || -
|- align="center" bgcolor="ffbbb"
| March 9 || at Lamar || – || Vincent–Beck Stadium || 0-8 || Dziedzic (2-1) || A. Grant (0-1)|| None || 547 || 1-5 || –
|- align="center" bgcolor="#ffbbb"
| March 15 ||  || – || Owen T. Carroll Field || 0-9 || J. Prosinski (2-2) || C. LeBlanc (0-2) || None || 278 || 1-6 || –
|- align="center" bgcolor="#ffbbb"
| March 16 ||  || – || Owen T. Carroll Field || 1-2 || C. Liquori (1-0) || D. Stoops (0-1) || None || 186 || 1-7 || –
|- align="center" bgcolor="#ffbbb"
| March 17 || Manhattan || – || Owen T. Carroll Field || 1-7 || S. McClennan (1-1) || J. Pace (1-1) || None || 136 || 1-8 || –
|- align="center" bgcolor="#ffbbb"
| March 17 || Seton Hall || – || Owen T. Carroll Field || 5-11 || S. Burum (2-0) || A. Grant (0-2) || None || 231 || 1-9 || –
|- bgcolor="#CCCCCC"
| March 20 ||  || – || Lorden Field ||colspan=7|Postponed until April 17th due to weather
|- align="center" bgcolor="#ffbbb"
| March 22 || at * || – || Barcroft Park || 1-4 || L. Staub (1-0) || D. Jauss (0-3) || C. Lejeune(2) || 150 || 1-10 || 0-1
|- align="center" bgcolor="#ffbbb"
| March 22 || at George Washington* || – || Barcroft Park || 1-7 || A. Weisberg (1-0) || A. Grant (0-3) || None || 150 || 1-11 || 0-2
|- align="center" bgcolor="#ffbbb"
| March 24 || at George Washington* || – || Barcroft Park || 0–1 || M. Kablow (2-3) || J. Pace (1-2) || C. Lejeune(3) || 70 || 1–12 || 0–3
|- bgcolor="#CCCCCC"
| March 26 || at  || – || Fitton Field || ||colspan=7|Postponed due to weather
|- bgcolor="#ccffcc"
| March 29 ||  || – || Lorden Field || 10-4 || D. Jauss (1-3) || T. Davis (0-4) || A. Plunkett(1) || 221 || 2-12 || 0-3
|- bgcolor="#ccffcc"
| March 30 || NJIT || – || Lorden Field || 1–0 || A. Grant (1-3) || M. Leiter (3-4) || R. Wallace(1) || 225 || 3-12 || 0-3
|- align="center" bgcolor="ffbbb"
| March 30 || NJIT || – || Lorden Field || 6-7 || I. Bentley (1-1) || R. Wallace (0-1) || None || 210 || 3-13 || 0-3
|-

|- align="center" bgcolor="#ffbbb"
|April 1 || at  || - || Siena Baseball Field || 4–8 || B. Goossens (1-3) || A. Plunkett (0-1) || N. Fyer(3) || 100 || 3-14 || 0-3
|- align="center" bgcolor="#ffbbb"
|April 3 || at  || - || Parsons Field || 1-3 || J. Mulry (1-0) || C. LeBlanc (0-3) || D. Maki(4) || 57 || 3-15 || 0-3
|- align="center" bgcolor="#ffbbb"
|April 5 || at Rhode Island* || - || Bill Beck Field || 2-9 || M. Bradstreet (4-3) || D. Jauss (1-4) || None || 204 || 3-16 || 0-4
|- bgcolor="#ccffcc"
|April 6 || at Rhode Island* || - || Bill Beck Field || 2-0 || A. Grant (2-3) || S. Furney (3-3) || None || 240 || 4-16 || 1-4
|- align="center" bgcolor="#ffbbb"
|April 7 || at Rhode Island* || - || Bill Beck Field || 1-3 || B. Dean (2-1) || J. Pace (1-3) || S. Moyers(1) || 219 || 4-17 || 1-5
|- bgcolor="#ccffcc"
| April 10 ||  (Beanpot Baseball Tournament Semi-Final)|| - || Lorden Field || 11-6 || E. Macintosh (1-0) || J. Adams (0-1) || None || 236 || 5-17 || 1-5
|- align="center" bgcolor="#ffbbb"
| April 13 || * || - || Lorden Field || 3-4 || A. Revello (3-4) || A. Grant (2-4) || C. Grey(1) || 197 || 5-18 || 1-6
|- bgcolor="#ccffcc"
| April 13 || St. Bonaventure* || - || Lorden Field || 9-3 || J. Pace (2-3) || A. Johnson (1-1) || None || 197 || 6-18 || 2-6
|- bgcolor="#ccffcc"
| April 14 || St. Bonaventure* || - || Lorden Field || 6-5 || R. Wallace (1-1) || J. Rosencrance (2-2) || None || 200 || 7-18 || 3-6
|- bgcolor="#ccffcc"
| April 16 ||  || - || Lorden Field || 9-5 || D. Stoops (1-1) || M. Pastore (0-1) || None || 190 || 8-18 || 3-6
|- bgcolor="#ccffcc"
|April 17 ||  || - || Lorden Field || 4-3 || J. Pace (3-3) || J. Charles (0-1) || None || 150 || 9-18 || 3-6
|- align="center" bgcolor="#ffbbb"
| April 19 || at * || - || Hank DeVincent Field || 5-17 ||  Donohue (2-3) || A. Grant (2-5) || None || 118 || 9-19 || 3-7
|- align="center" bgcolor="#ffbbb"
| April 20 || at La Salle* || - || Hank DeVincent Field || 7-9 || Clark (2-1) || J. Pace (3-4) || Christensen(7) || 142 || 9-20 || 3-8
|- align="center" bgcolor="#ffbbb"
| April 21 || at La Salle* || - || Hank DeVincent Field || 2-6 || Hollman (3-3) || C. LeBlanc (0-4) || Christensen(8) || 134 || 9-21 || 3-9
|- align="center" bgcolor="#ffbbb"
| April 23 || at Connecticut || - || J. O. Christian Field || 4-5 || Catalina (1-0) || A. Plunkett (0-2) || Tabakman(5) || 90 || 9-22 || 3-9
|- align="center" bgcolor="#ffbbb"
| April 26 || * || - || Lorden Field || 4-7 || L. Veeder (1-0) || A. Plunkett (0-3) || J. Yacobinis(6) || 140 || 9-23 || 3-10
|- bgcolor="#ccffcc"
| April 27 || St. Joseph's* || - || Lorden Field || 10-4 || C. LeBlanc (1-4) || Carter (3-3) || None || 201 || 10-23 || 4-10
|- align="center" bgcolor="#ffbbb"
| April 28 || St. Joseph's* || - || Lorden Field || 5-10 || Thorpe (4-6) || J. Pace (3-5) || Yacabonis(7) || 213 || 10-24 || 4-11
|- align="center" bgcolor="#ffbbb"
| April 29 || Northeastern (Beanpot Baseball Tournament Final) || - || Fenway Park || 3-6 || Cook (2-0) || A. Plunkett (0-4) || Foster(1) || 1,563 || 10-25 || 4-11
|-

|- bgcolor="#ccffcc"
| May 1 || at  || - || Quinnipiac Baseball Field || 11-8 || R. Wallace (2-1) || Musco (0-3) || J. Pace(1) || 135 || 11-25 || 4-11
|- align="center" bgcolor="#ffbbb"
| May 3 ||  * || - || Lorden Field || 5-12 || Charest (2-8) || A. Grant (2-6) || None || 125 || 11-26 || 4-12
|- align="center" bgcolor="#ffbbb"
| May 4 ||  Fordham* || - || Lorden Field || 1-2 || Pike (3-6) || C. LeBlanc (1-5) || None || 202 || 11-27 || 4-13
|- align="center" bgcolor="#ffbbb"
| May 5 || Fordham* || - || Lorden Field || 9-11 || Reich (2-0) || A. Plunkett (0-5) || None || 151 || 11-28 || 4-14
|- align="center" bgcolor="#ffbbb"
| May 10 || at * || - || J. Page Hayden Field || 3-4 || KLEVER (5-4) ||  LeBlanc (1-6) || VICE (7) || 389 || 11-29 || 4-15
|- align="center" bgcolor="#ffbbb"
| May 11 || at Xavier* || - || J. Page Hayden Field || 3-15 || J. Richard (8-3) || A. Grant (2-7) || None || 250 || 11-30 || 4-16
|- align="center" bgcolor="#ffbbb"
| May 12 || at Xavier* || - || J. Page Hayden Field || 0-1 || Koors (5-5) || A. Plunkett (0-6) || None || 316 || 11-31 || 4-17
|- bgcolor="#ccffcc"
| May 16 || at * || - || Skip Wilson Field || 4-3 ||C. LeBlanc (2-6) || P. Peterson (2-7) || J. Pace(2) || 193 || 12-31 || 5-17
|- bgcolor="#ccffcc"
| May 17 || at Temple* || - || Skip Wilson Field || 6-3 || A. Grant (3-7) || E. Peterson (6-3) || J. Pace(3) || 178 || 13-31 || 6-17
|- bgcolor="#ccffcc"
| May 18 || at Temple* || - || Skip Wilson Field || 11-9 || A. Plunkett (1-6) || Moller (1-7) || None || 178 || 14-31 || 7-17
|-

|-
| style="font-size:88%" | Rankings from USA TODAY/ESPN Top 25 coaches' baseball poll. Parenthesis indicate tournament seedings.
|-
| style="font-size:88%" | *Atlantic 10 Conference games

References 

UMass
UMass Minutemen baseball seasons